Mahlon Jesse Higbee (August 16, 1901 – April 7, 1968) was a Major League Baseball outfielder who started three games for the New York Giants during the last week of the 1922 season.

The 21-year-old rookie began the season with the Hopkinsville Hoppers of the KITTY League. The Louisville, Kentucky native dominated the Class D circuit, leading the league with a .385 batting average, 161 hits and 101 runs scored. Impressed, the Giants (who had already clinched the National League pennant) brought Higbee to New York, and the kid did not disappoint, with a .400 average (4-for-10), five runs batted in and two runs scored. (Higbee's 5 RBI is the most for any MLB player who appeared in three games or fewer.) All three of Higbee's games were played at the Polo Grounds, and all were Giant victories. Higbee also socked an inside-the-park home run in what would be his final major league at bat. It was the only home run of his Major League career.  In the field, he played left field and right field, with two putouts and no errors.

Higbee did not play in the 1922 World Series (a victory for the Giants over the New York Yankees), and was returned to the minors. Higbee did not play at all in 1923, then spent two seasons with the Portsmouth Truckers of the Class B Virginia League, batting .273 in 153 games. After another break in 1926, Higbee returned to pro ball in 1927 with the Evansville Hubs of the Three-I League, retiring after hitting just .188 in sixteen games.

Higbee died at the age of 66 in Depauw, Indiana.

See also
List of Major League Baseball players with a home run in their final major league at bat

References

External links
Baseball Reference
Retrosheet

Major League Baseball outfielders
Baseball players from Louisville, Kentucky
New York Giants (NL) players
1901 births
1968 deaths
Major League Baseball left fielders
Major League Baseball right fielders